It's About Time is the lone studio record by Julie Reeves, released in 1999 on Virgin Records. "Trouble Is a Woman", "What I Need" and "It's About Time" all charted on Billboard's Hot Country Songs. The album peaked at No. 70 on Billboard's Top Country Albums on April 7, 2000. Reeves was nomination for New Female Vocalist of the Year by the Academy of Country Music Awards in 2000.

Heather Phares of AllMusic writes, "Julie Reeves sweet but gutsy vocals take center stage on her debut album, 1999's It's About Time." Kevin Oliver of Country Standard Time writes, "Reeves is a full-throated 24 year old with the prerequisite supermodel looks of a current female country star. Not just another pretty face, however, she has some serious vocal chops to spare"

Track listing

Track information and credits taken from the album's liner notes.

Charts

Singles

References

External links
Virgin Records Official Site

1999 debut albums
Virgin Records albums
Albums produced by Scott Hendricks